Auclair–Button Farmstead is a historic home and farm and national historic district located at Melrose, Rensselaer County, New York. The original section of the farmhouse was built about 1785, with the main block built in 1849.  It is a two-story, five bay, frame house with a side-gabled roof. It features a full-width front porch.  Also on the property are the contributing garage (c. 1930), ice house (c. 1900), tenant house (c. 1805-1840) and garage (c. 1930), shop barn (c. 1810-1830), dairy barn (c. 1901), milk house (c. 1910), horse barn (c. 1820–1840, c. 1894, c. 1900), hen house (c. 1910), and corn crib (c. 1900).

It was listed on the National Register of Historic Places in 2013.

References

Farms on the National Register of Historic Places in New York (state)
Historic districts on the National Register of Historic Places in New York (state)
1785 establishments in New York (state)
Houses completed in 1785
Buildings and structures in Rensselaer County, New York
National Register of Historic Places in Rensselaer County, New York